The Whole Ten Yards is a 2004 American crime comedy film directed by Howard Deutch and starring Bruce Willis, Matthew Perry, Amanda Peet, Natasha Henstridge, and Kevin Pollak. It is a sequel to the 2000 film The Whole Nine Yards. It was based on characters created by Mitchell Kapner, who was the writer of the first film.

The film was released on April 7, 2004 in the United States. Unlike the first film, which was rated R and was a commercial success despite receiving mixed reviews, The Whole Ten Yards received a PG-13 rating and was a critical and commercial failure.

Plot 
Thanks to falsified dental records supplied by his former neighbor Nicholas "Oz" Ozeransky, retired hitman Jimmy "The Tulip" Tudeski spends his days compulsively cleaning his house and perfecting his culinary skills with his wife, Jill, a purported assassin who has yet to pull off a "clean" hiteveryone she is hired to kill dies in bizarre accidents before she has a chance. Oz now owns a dental practice in California and has married Jimmy's ex-wife Cynthia and expecting their first child, but the relationship is strained by Oz's excessive paranoia as well as Cynthia's secret continued contact with Jimmy.

Their lives are further complicated by the return of Laszlo Gogolak, Jimmy's former mob boss and father figure, whose son Janni was killed by Jimmy and Jill while Laszlo was in prison. Having deduced that Jimmy faked his death, Laszlo abducts Cynthia and threatens Oz to try to learn Jimmy's location, but Oz escapes. A desperate Oz contacts Jimmy and Jill, but Jimmy refuses to help until Laszlo's men attack, having followed Oz to Jimmy.

Capturing Laszlo's remaining son Strabovitz, Jimmy offers to trade Strabo for Cynthia. Oz triggers further conflict between Jimmy and Jill when he reveals Jimmy still wears a crucifix from Cynthia. At a bar, Jimmy becomes increasingly depressed at his failure to father a child with Jill, and aggravates Oz by discussing his and Cynthia's old sex life, culminating in Oz and Jimmy becoming so drunk they wake up in the same bed.

Frustrated by her poor sex life with Jimmy, Jill attempts to seduce Oz but is interrupted by Jimmy, who knocks Oz out and regains his passion for Jill and his work as the two have sex in the bathroom. Re-arming themselves at Oz's house, the three are attacked by an unknown marksman and Strabo is killed in the crossfire. Jimmy insults Jill’s capabilities and coldly dismisses Oz; Jill leaves. Oz retreats to his practice where he is met by Jimmy, who apologizes for recent events. The two are chloroformed by Oz's new receptionist Julie, revealed to be the sister of Frankie Figgs, seeking revenge for Oz and Jimmy's role in her brother's death.

Waking up beside Cynthia and Jimmy in Laszlo's apartment, Oz is shocked to learn that the entire situation has been planned by Jimmy and Cynthia to find Laszlo's half of the first dollar he ever stole, which he had torn and divided between Jimmy and Yanni as kids. As Laszlo prepares to kill them, Jill arrives, having tied up Strabo's body in her car with explosives to appear alive, and threatens to detonate unless Laszlo releases Oz and Cynthia. Asking to join Laszlo's organization, Jill is ordered to kill Jimmy, who tells her she'll never be a successful hitter before she shoots him in the heart.

Jill's car explodes as Laszlo's men try to release Strabo, revealing Jill was in on the plan and shot Jimmy with blanks. Jules is exposed as the shooter who killed Strabo, and Laszlo shoots her. Jimmy, unable to kill the man who raised him, has Jill shoot Laszlo in the foot. Jimmy and Cynthia further reveal that Laszlo's half of the dollar combines with Jimmy’s to reveal the number for a $280 million bank account. Jill reveals she is pregnant, and the four drive away as Laszlo is arrested.

Cast

Reception

Box office 
Unlike the first film, which was a commercial success, The Whole Ten Yards was a box office bomb, bringing in only $16.3 million in North America and $9.8 million internationally. With a worldwide total of $26.2 million, less than a quarter the gross of the original, the film did not recoup its $40 million budget.

Critical response
On Rotten Tomatoes the film has an approval rating of 4% based on 120 reviews, with an average rating of 3/10. The website's critics consensus states: "A strained, laugh-free sequel, The Whole Ten Yards recycles its predecessor's cast and plot but not its wit or reason for being." On Metacritic the film has a weighted average score of 24 out of 100, based on 27 critics, indicating "generally unfavorable reviews". Audiences polled by CinemaScore gave the film an average grade of "C" on an A+ to F scale.

References

External links 
 
 
 
 
 

2004 films
2000s crime comedy films
Films about dentistry
Mafia comedy films
American sequel films
Films directed by Howard Deutch
Films scored by John Debney
Franchise Pictures films
Films produced by Elie Samaha
American crime comedy films
Warner Bros. films
2000s English-language films
2000s American films